Henry Christian Spencer (June 24, 1915 – May 30, 1999) was an American businessman and executive at the Kerite Company in Seymour, Connecticut. As secretary and vice president, he was involved in discussions about unions at the company, and in its joining with Hubbell Company.

Early life and education
He was born at St. Luke's Hospital in Cedar Rapids, Iowa the son of Dr. William Henry Spencer and Bertha (Wenig) Spencer.

His father, William Henry Spencer, (1878–1936) graduated from the Illinois College of Physicians and Surgeons, Chicago, in 1904. After a fellowship at Cook County Hospital, he practiced in Cedar Rapids, with an office in the Granby Building. His ancestors had been early Iowan settlers from New England. 
 
His mother, Bertha Wenig, (1884-1974) was the daughter of George Kaspar Wenig and Ida Ernst Wenig, both of Cedar Rapids. She studied education at the Armour Institute, now Illinois Institute of Technology and taught in the Cedar Rapids schools. She was active at St. John's Episcopal Church.

Henry Spencer attended Washington High School in Cedar Rapids, and graduated from Iowa State College in 1936 with a B.S. in Chemical Engineering. He was a member of the Sigma Alpha Epsilon fraternity.

Career
He worked for the Calco Chemical Company from 1936 to 1946, partly at American Cyanamid in New Jersey. After this, he moved to Connecticut.

He began working for Kerite Company in Seymour, Connecticut in 1951. In 1969, he was elected Secretary of the Kerite. Later, he served as vice president. In 1973, he reported that the company employees had voted against joining the United Rubber, Cork, Linoleum, and Plastic Workers Union. The vote had been 208 to 132 out of 380 eligible workers. Kerite was the largest employer in Seymour, Connecticut. In 1977, he wrote a letter to Senator Strom Thurmond strongly condemning the Voluntary Standards and Accreditation Act of 1977, in which he wrote that the act "reeks of socialism." He retired from Kerite in 1978.

He served as Chairman of the Manufacturers Council of the Lower Naugatuck Valley Chamber of Commerce, and worked on projects including a 'clergy-industry conference,' and the establishment of the Waterbury-Oxford Airport
He was also the Industrial Chairman for the first Valley United Fund Drive, and he sought donations from over 150 corporations for a variety of community organizations.

He was a corporator of Griffin Hospital in Derby, CT, a director of the Lower Naugatuck Valley Chamber of Commerce, chairman of the Board of Junior Achievement of the Lower Naugatuck Valley, a deacon at the Middlebury Congregational Church, and master mason at King Solomon's Lodge No. 7 AF&AM in Woodbury, Connecticut, of which he was the Worshipful Master in 1959. He also served as district deputy of the Second Masonic District, and in this capacity he visited the Union Lodge in Danbury, CT. 
He was also a member of the Boy Scouts, the Republican Town Committee, and the Middlebury Hunt. He was a founder of the Middlebury Land Trust in 1969, and later, a member of the South Britain Congregational Church.

Between 1953 and 1963, he was a feature in multiple musicals as part of a comic opera group at the Middlebury Congregational Church.

He was also a founder and president of the Spencer Historical and Genealogical Society, and authored many important articles in its journal, Le Despencer.

Family life
He married Evelyn Burchard (1913-2002), on December 28, 1938, in the chapel of St. Paul's Methodist Church in Cedar Rapids. She was the daughter of Frederick Burchard, the owner of the Royal Laundry in Cedar Rapids, and Stella (Johnson) Burchard.

Evelyn graduated from Iowa State College in 1938 and was a member of the Gamma Phi Beta sorority. Together, they had five children, and one (William) who died in infancy: Samuel, Thomas, Stella, Michael, and Rebecca Spencer. Beginning in 1947, they lived in an old house in Middlebury, Connecticut. She was a trustee and a deacon of the Middlebury Congregational Church. 
She served on the board of Regional School District 15 and the site selection committee for Pomperaug High School. She was a charter member of the Middlebury Historical Society, and a Master Gardener in the State of Connecticut.

In 1972, he married Mary P. Adams. They lived in Southbury, Connecticut and retired in Green Valley, Arizona.

Henry's brother, Dr. Carl G. Spencer (1917-1985), was a large animal veterinarian. A scholarship in his name at the Iowa State University College of Veterinary Medicine was for students interested in pursuing bovine and ovine medicine. Together, the brothers erected a gravestone memorializing their grandfather, George Cogswell Spencer and their father, William Henry Spencer, M.D.

Genealogy
 Henry Christian Spencer, son of
 William Henry Spencer (1878–1936), son of 
 George Cogswell Spencer (1854–1926), son of
 Abner Nutting Spencer (1820–1879), son of
 William Spencer (1781–1871), son of
 Ashbel Spencer (1737–1808), son of
 Caleb Spencer (1709–1789), son of
 Obadiah Spencer (c. 1666–1741), son of
 Obadiah Spencer (c. 1639–1712), son of
 Thomas Spencer (1607–1687)

References

1915 births
1999 deaths
American Freemasons
American chemical engineers
Iowa State University alumni
People from Cedar Rapids, Iowa
People from Middlebury, Connecticut
People from Green Valley, Arizona
Engineers from Arizona
Engineers from Connecticut
20th-century American engineers